12 Gardens Live is the fourth live album by American singer/songwriter Billy Joel, recorded during a former record run of 12 sold-out concerts at Madison Square Garden in New York City in early 2006. It was released on June 13, 2006.

Although some of the singer's best known hits are on the album, many of them are transposed into a lower key to accom Joel's deepening voice for the duration of the tour. This is also the first time Joel's signature song "Piano Man" has appeared on a live CD.

Track listing
All songs written by Billy Joel.

Disc one
 "Prelude/Angry Young Man" – 5:21
 "My Life" – 4:59
 "Everybody Loves You Now" – 3:04
 "The Ballad of Billy the Kid" – 5:30
 "The Entertainer" – 4:01
 "Vienna" – 3:35
 "New York State of Mind" – 7:05
 "The Night Is Still Young" – 5:13
 "Zanzibar" – 5:57
 "Miami 2017 (Seen the Lights Go Out on Broadway)" – 5:03
 "The Great Wall of China" – 5:07
 "Allentown" – 3:51
 "She's Right On Time" – 3:56
 "Don't Ask Me Why" – 3:10
 "Laura" – 5:19
 "A Room of Our Own" (hidden track) – 4:10

Disc two
 "Goodnight Saigon" – 7:17
 "Movin' Out (Anthony's Song)" – 3:48
 "An Innocent Man" – 5:41
 "The Downeaster "Alexa"" – 3:50
 "She's Always a Woman" – 3:41
 "Keeping the Faith" – 4:53
 "The River of Dreams" – 5:21
 "A Matter of Trust" – 4:39
 "We Didn't Start the Fire" – 4:47
 "Big Shot" – 4:23
 "You May Be Right" – 4:49
 "Only the Good Die Young" – 3:43
 "Scenes from an Italian Restaurant" – 7:35
 "Piano Man" – 5:43
 "And So It Goes" – 3:50
 "It's Still Rock and Roll to Me" (hidden track) – 3:26

In addition to the above, the iTunes Store offers two extra songs, "Stiletto" and "Honesty". Also for a short time, Sony Music Direct was offering direct downloads of "You're My Home" and "Sleeping with the Television On" as an incentive to purchase the CD from Sony Music's website.

Personnel 
 Billy Joel – lead vocals, grand piano, keyboards, harmonica
 David Rosenthal – keyboards, grand piano, organ, backing vocals 
 Mark Rivera – keyboards, guitars, saxophone, flute, backing vocals 
 Tommy Byrnes – guitars, music director 
 Crystal Taliefero – guitars, percussion, saxophone, backing vocals 
 Andy Cichon – bass, backing vocals 
 Chuck Burgi – drums
 Richie Cannata – saxophones 
 Carl Fischer – trombone, trumpet

Charts

References

Billy Joel live albums
2006 live albums
Columbia Records live albums
Albums recorded at Madison Square Garden
Albums produced by Steve Lillywhite